SERVIS-2, or Space Environment Reliability Verification Integrated System 2, is a Japanese technological research satellite which was launched in 2010. It was constructed by Mitsubishi Electric, and will be operated by the Institute for Unmanned Space Experiment Free Flyer, USEF. It follows on from the SERVIS-1 spacecraft, which was launched in 2003.

Launch
The launch of SERVIS-2 was conducted by Eurockot, using a Rokot carrier rocket with a Briz-KM upper stage. The launch occurred from Site 133/3 at the Plesetsk Cosmodrome in Russia. Eurockot, who were also responsible for launching the SERVIS-1 spacecraft, were awarded the contract to launch SERVIS-2 on 21 February 2007.

SERVIS-2 arrived at the Plesetsk Cosmodrome on 26 April 2010. Prior to launch, the spacecraft underwent final testing and fuelling, and was subsequently attached to its launch adaptor on 22 May. This was attached to the upper stage the next day, and the day after that the spacecraft was encapsulated in the payload fairing. Under terminology used by Eurockot, as well as several other launch service providers, the combination of spacecraft, adaptor, upper stage and fairing was designated the Upper Composite. This was transported to the launch pad on 27 May for integration with the first two stages of the rocket. The launch occurred successfully at 01:59 UTC on 2 June 2010.

Spacecraft
SERVIS-2 is a  spacecraft, which measures . It is intended to conduct experiments related to the demonstration of technology to be used in future missions, particularly research into the use of commercial off-the-shelf equipment. The spacecraft has a design life of one year, and its Solar panels will provide it with at least 1,300 watts of power.

Experiments
Nine experiments are being conducted by SERVIS-2.  They are mostly described (in Japanese) in a special edition of Uchu Kagaku Gijutsu Rengo Koenkai Koenshu (Proceedings of the Space Sciences and Technology Conference).

The Commercial Parts Test Unit on SERVIS-2 is carrying 4Mbit and 8Mbit SRAM chips, 256Mbit and 512Mbit DRAM chips, 128kbit SOI SRAM chips made on a 180 nm process, and NOR-type 128Mbit flash memory chips.

See also

2010 in spaceflight

References

Satellites of Japan
Spacecraft launched in 2010
Mitsubishi Electric products, services and standards